Künga Gyaltsen may refer to:
 Kunga Gyaltsen (Imperial Preceptor)
 Another name for Sakya Pandita
 The first in the line of Trungpa tülkus